Aerated chocolate, also known as air chocolate, is a type of chocolate which has been turned into a foam via the addition of gas bubbles. The process for manufacturing it was invented by Rowntree's in 1935. During manufacturing the fluid chocolate mass is foamed with a propellant, and then cooled in a low pressure environment.  As the bubbles of gas expand they cool and help set the chocolate. This helps to maintain an even bubble distribution within the chocolate. Due to the isolating effect of the bubbles, air chocolate melts differently from compact bar chocolate—the feeling of the chocolate melting is fragile-short at first, then as the chocolate is chewed it melts rapidly due to its bigger surface area.

Nitrogen, argon, carbon dioxide and nitrous oxide are often used as propellants for air chocolate. Air itself is not used as a propellant because it contains oxygen which speeds up rancidification of the chocolate. A survey funded by Nestlé, conducted at the University of Reading, revealed that chocolate foamed with nitrogen—and especially with nitrous oxide—has the most intense taste. The researchers found that this was due to the larger bubbles which these gases produce. Further research by Nestlé has concluded that "[t]he existing technology to control bubble size and distribution is difficult," which has led to experiments involving the creation of foams under zero-gravity conditions.

In 2013, Chinese scientists announced results from a study using phospholipids derived from soybeans to aerate cocoa butter.

Brands 

Aero (chocolate)
Galaxy Bubbles
Hershey's Air Delight
Mirage (chocolate)
Wispa
Lotte Ghana
Milka

References 

Types of chocolate
Chocolate desserts
Food and drink preparation